The Gunnison Tunnel is an irrigation tunnel constructed between 1905 and 1909 by the U.S. Bureau of Reclamation in Montrose County, Colorado. The  tunnel diverts water from the Gunnison River to the arid Uncompahgre Valley around Montrose, Colorado.

At the time of its completion, it was the longest irrigation tunnel in the world and quickly made the area around Montrose into profitable agricultural lands. In 1972, the tunnel was designated a National Historic Civil Engineering Landmark by the American Society of Civil Engineers (ASCE).

The idea for a tunnel is credited to Frank Lauzon, a miner and prospector. By the early 1890s he was farming in Montrose. Popular lore is that idea came to him in a dream that the waters of the Gunnison River should be brought to the valley.

As construction was undertaken, two advances in technology made work safer and easier. Jackhammers fed by a compressor replaced hand-turned drill bits to set holes for blasting charges. Dynamite replaced black powder for blasting. By 1906 shifts of workers up to 30 at a time worked in the tunnel.

The tunnel opened in 1909 to much fanfare with a dedication ceremony attended by President William Howard Taft.

It was listed on the National Register of Historic Places in 1979.

At the deepest, it is about  beneath the surface of Vernal Mesa.

See also
List of Historic Civil Engineering Landmarks
List of tunnels documented by the Historic American Engineering Record in Colorado

References

Further reading

External links

American Society of Civil Engineers site - The Gunnison Tunnel article

Gunnison River
Tunnels in Colorado
Water tunnels in the United States
Water tunnels on the National Register of Historic Places
Transportation buildings and structures in Montrose County, Colorado
Curecanti National Recreation Area
Historic American Engineering Record in Colorado
Interbasin transfer
Industrial buildings and structures on the National Register of Historic Places in Colorado
National Register of Historic Places in Montrose County, Colorado
National Register of Historic Places in national parks
Transportation buildings and structures on the National Register of Historic Places in Colorado
Water supply infrastructure on the National Register of Historic Places
Historic Civil Engineering Landmarks
Tunnels completed in 1909